The West Indies cricket team toured Australia in the 1996–97 season and played 5 Test matches against Australia. Australia won the series 3-2. As of 2022, this is the last occasion on which the West Indies won a Test Match on Australian soil. The team also played the 1996–97 Carlton and United Series, a One Day International tournament, against Australia and Pakistan and lost 2–0 to Pakistan in a best of three finals series.

Test series summary

First Test

Second Test

Third Test

Fourth Test

Fifth Test

References
 Playfair Cricket Annual
 Wisden Cricketers Almanack (annual)

External sources
 CricketArchive

1996 in Australian cricket
1996 in West Indian cricket
1996–97 Australian cricket season
1997 in Australian cricket
1997 in West Indian cricket
International cricket competitions from 1994–95 to 1997
1996-97